Poppitt is a surname. Notable people with the surname include:

Jimmy Poppitt (1875–1930), English footballer
John Poppitt (1923–2014), English footballer
Sally Poppitt, New Zealand nutrition academic

See also
Poppet